Special Area may refer to:

Special Area of Conservation, a protection area for fauna and flora designated by the European Union
Special Areas Board, Alberta, Canada, which governs three rural municipalities
Special Area No. 2
Special Area No. 3
Special Area No. 4
Special areas in Hong Kong, also called country parks
Lai Chi Wo Special Area
Ma Shi Chau Special Area
Tai Po Kau Special Area
Tsiu Hang Special Area
Tung Lung Fort Special Area
Special Flight Rules Area, a region in the United States where the normal rules of flight do not apply
Special Landscape Area, conservation designation used by local government in the United Kingdom
Special Protection Area, a protection area for wild birds designated by the European Union

Special Areas Act may refer to:

Special Areas Act 1934, Britain, to give aid to areas with high unemployment rates
Special Areas (Amendment) Act of 1937, Britain, to encourage business after the Special Areas Act 1934
Special Areas Act 1938, Alberta, Canada, to establish 3.2 million hectares of special areas